The African Lion Safari was a wildlife park that Stafford Bullen opened in 1968. It operated near Warragamba on the outskirts of Sydney in New South Wales, Australia until 1991.

There was also a dolphinarium in the African Lion Safari.

History
African Lion Safari was opened by Stafford Bullen (1925–2001) in 1968. At the time, Bullen was still operating a travelling circus, but in 1969 he gave this venture a permanent home at Bullen's Animal World. For the opening, a promotional single of The Tokens' "The Lion Sleeps Tonight" was recorded by a band using the name "The Love Machine" (the band turned out to be Tymepiece). The safari was popular in its early years and attracted up to 200,000 visitors each year.

With the suburbs encroaching on the facility, and extensive work required to upgrade the park following legislative changes, it eventually closed in 1991 but continued to hold animals on site that were used in a circus but not displayed to the public.

African Lion Safari originally opened in Warragamba, however sometime after this it relocated to neighbouring Wallacia, where it had a drive through area full of wild animals i.e. lions, bears, and tigers.

Incidents
On 7 August 1995, a lioness escaped from the park, roamed the nearby townships of Warragamba and Silverdale, and killed a dog. The lioness responsible for killing the dog was shot by a park employee. As a result of the escape, the park was required to upgrade facilities. A bear also escaped and was shot by residents, as reported by Michael Feeny

Notes

References

External links
  1980s Television Commercial on Youtube

Zoos in New South Wales
1968 establishments in Australia
1991 disestablishments in Australia
Defunct amusement parks in Australia
Former zoos
Safari parks
Zoos established in 1968
Zoos disestablished in 1991
Warragamba, New South Wales